Blues Connotation is an album by American blues guitarist Robben Ford.

The album A Song I thought I heard Buddy Sing contains material from the same sessions and was released in 1993 under Jerry Granelli's name.

Track listing
"City Life" (Jerry Granelli) — 9:28
"One Day at a Time" (Jerry Granelli, Charlie Haden) — 8:33
"I Could See Forever" (Denney Goodhew) — 6:27
"Wanderlust" (Johnny Hodges) — 7:41
"Billie's Bounce" (Charlie Parker) — 6:24
"I Put a Spell on You" (Screamin' Jay Hawkins) — 7:30
"Blues Connotation" (Ornette Coleman) — 6:06
"Blues Connotation Reprise" (Ornette Coleman) — 4:08

Personnel
Robben Ford, Bill Frisell - guitar
Anthony Cox, Charlie Haden - bass
Ralph Towner - synthesizer
Jerry Granelli - drums, synthesizer
Kenny Garrett - alto saxophone
Julian Priester - trombone
Technical
Rick Parashar - engineer

References

1996 albums
Robben Ford albums